Porabari Union is a union of Tangail Sadar Upazila, Tangail District, Bangladesh. It is the place of origin for the chomchom, a sweetmeat eaten throughout the Indian subcontinent.

Demographics
According to Population Census 2011 performed by Bangladesh Bureau of Statistics, The total population of Porabari union is 21,622. There are 4,897 households in total.

See also
 Union Councils of Tangail District

References

Populated places in Dhaka Division
Populated places in Tangail District
Unions of Tangail Sadar Upazila